Pterophorus furcatalis, the Pittosporum plume moth, is a moth of the family Pterophoridae. It was first described by Frances Walker and is endemic to New Zealand. This species can be found throughout the North, South and Stewart Islands. Its preferred habitat is dense native bush. Larval host plants include Pittosporum eugenioides and Pittosporum crassicaule. Adult moths are on the wing from November to March and are attracted to light.

Taxonomy
This species was first described by Frances Walker in 1864 and named Aciptilus furcatalis. Walker used specimens from Colonel Bolton collected in Auckland and T.R. Oxley collected in Nelson. In 1913 Edward Meyrick placed Aciptilus furcatalis into the genus Alucita. In 1928 George Hudson followed Meyrick's placement discussing and illustrating this species in his 1928 publication The butterflies and moths of New Zealand. In 1988 John S. Dugdale discussed this species under the name Pterophorus furcatalis. In 1993 Cees Gielis discussed this species under the name Pterophorus furcatalis but placed it in a list where the species were regarded as having an uncertain status. The lectotype specimen, collected by T. R. Oxley in Nelson, is held at the Natural History Museum, London.

Description

In 1928 Hudson illustrated the egg of this species. Hudson subsequently described the larva of this species as follows:

The larvae are slow moving and rest on the upper surface of the leaves of its food plants.

Hudson also described the pupa as follows:

The larva prepares a large pad of silk on a support upon which the pupa is attached by the whole of its flattened ventral surface.

Hudson described the adults of this species as follows:

Some species have markings that are a darker shade of brown. This species can possibly be confused with the brown streak form of P. monospilalis.  P. furcatalis but can be distinguished as the second plume is brown where as with P. monospilalis that second plume is white. P. furcatalis also has a brown streak down the dorsal side of its abdomen which is also a distinguishing feature.

Distribution 
This species is endemic to New Zealand. It can be found throughout the country including in the North, South and Stewart Islands.

Habitat and hosts

This species inhabits dense native forest. The larval hosts of this species include Pittosporum eugenioides and Pittosporum crassicaule. Larvae reared on P. crassicaule produce pupa strongly spotted with black.

Behaviour 
Adults of this species are on the wing from November to March. They are attracted to light.

References

Moths described in 1864
furcatalis
Moths of New Zealand
Endemic fauna of New Zealand
Taxa named by Francis Walker (entomologist)
Endemic moths of New Zealand